Ocean Bluff-Brant Rock is a census-designated place (CDP) in Plymouth County, Massachusetts, United States, composed of the neighborhoods of Ocean Bluff, Brant Rock, Fieldston, and Rexhame in the town of Marshfield. The population of the CDP was 4,970 at the 2010 census.

History 
Brant Rock and Ocean Bluff were originally inhabited by Native Americans, including members of the Wampanoag tribe of the Algonquian peoples. Native American artifacts have been found extensively in the area. The main road through the area, known today as Ocean Street, is a Native American road, likely very ancient. The area at the end of Brant Rock village, known as Blackman's Point, was a Native American campground.

In the 1630s, the government of the Pilgrim settlers at Plymouth began to give out land grants in the area.

The Ocean Bluff area was first granted to the governor of the Pilgrims. It was known by about 1638 as "Governor's Island.” Later on in the 17th century, it became known as "Winter's Island". Christopher Winter was later tried in Plymouth Court for the crime of fathering his own grandchild. Eventually, his daughter married a man named John Hewitt, and he became the owner of Winter's Island. For many generations the area was known as Hewitt's Island, or Hewitt's Point. However, today most residents refer to the area as "Ocean Bluff.”

Brant Rock was originally known as "Branch's Island.” The name "Brant Rock" eventually came into use, because of the huge rock outcropping along the beach on which brant geese would tend to rest. From the 17th century through the late 19th century, the area was primarily used for salt marsh haying, cattle grazing, and for fishing and fowling. In the late 19th century, the area became populated by large summer resort hotels and tourist shops.

Hewitt's Island and Branch's Island were sometimes referred to as the "Spectacle Islands", because together the islands looked like a pair of spectacles or eyeglasses. After the Green Harbor Dyke was built following the Civil War, the tidal salt marshes in the area dried up. The Spectacle Islands were no longer surrounded by water from the tidal flooding of the marshes, and ceased to constitute "islands".

In January 1906, Reginald Fessenden achieved the first two-way transatlantic radiotelegraph transmission, exchanging Morse code messages between his stations in Brant Rock and Machrihanish, Scotland. (Marconi had only achieved one-way transmissions prior to his date). On Christmas Eve, December 24, 1906, Fessenden transmitted from Brant Rock Station the first audio radio broadcast of music and entertainment in history. Radio operators on ships in the Atlantic heard a broadcast that included Fessenden playing the song "O Holy Night" on the violin and reading a passage from the Bible.

Geography
Ocean Bluff and Brant Rock are located at  (42.101561, -70.660787), and are part of the town of Marshfield.

According to the United States Census Bureau, the CDP has a total area of 11.3 km2 (4.4 mi2), of which 5.3 km2 (2.0 mi2) is land and 6.0 km2 (2.3 mi2) is water, a total of 53.09%.

Ocean Bluff (02065) and Brant Rock (02020) contain five public beaches: Sunrise Beach, Ocean Bluff Beach, Brant Rock Beach, Blackman's Point, and Bluefish Cove. All of these beaches, as well as the rest of the Marshfield seashore from Green Harbor village to Rexhame village, were once known by the name of "Marshfield Beach". In 1832, the Supreme Judicial Court of Massachusetts ruled in the case of Briggs Thomas v. Inhabitants of Marshfield, 13 Pickering 240, that Rexhame Beach as well as all of the rest of "Marshfield Beach" was a "common,” open for use by all members of the public.

During the summer time, especially along Sunrise Beach and Ocean Bluff, skim boarding and surfing are very popular.

Demographics

As of the census of 2000, there were 5,100 people, 2,004 households, and 1,320 families residing in the CDP. The population density was 960.5/km2 (2,489.5/mi2). There were 2,657 housing units at an average density of 500.4/km2 (1,297.0/mi2). The racial makeup of the CDP was 98.35% White, 0.29% African American, 0.08% Native American, 0.29% Asian, 0.29% from other races, and 0.69% from two or more races. Hispanic or Latino of any race were 0.53% of the population.

There were 2,004 households, out of which 32.4% had children under the age of 18 living with them, 49.2% were married couples living together, 13.3% had a female householder with no husband present, and 34.1% were non-families. 26.5% of all households were made up of individuals, and 8.2% had someone living alone who was 65 years of age or older. The average household size was 2.54 and the average family size was 3.14.

In the CDP, the population was spread out, with 25.5% under the age of 18, 5.9% from 18 to 24, 33.0% from 25 to 44, 25.1% from 45 to 64, and 10.5% who were 65 years of age or older. The median age was 38 years. For every 100 females, there were 94.7 males. For every 100 females age 18 and over, there were 90.1 males.

The median income for a household in the CDP was $56,840, and the median income for a family was $60,552. Males had a median income of $42,388 versus $35,902 for females. The per capita income for the CDP was $24,292. About 3.1% of families and 5.3% of the population were below the poverty line, including 7.6% of those under age 18 and 3.4% of those age 65 or over.

Popular Culture 
The climax of the 2018 film The Equalizer 2 starring Denzel Washington unfolds on Brant Rock. The protagonist Robert McCall is a Defense Intelligence Agency operative, and the only reprised role in Mr. Washington's storied career.

References

Census-designated places in Plymouth County, Massachusetts
Census-designated places in Massachusetts